Raymond J. Lynch (December 4, 1909 – June 8, 2007) was an Administrative Law Judge for the Federal Trade Commission.

Early life

Raymond J. Lynch was born in Clinton, Iowa, December 4, 1909.  He was the son of Albert Joseph and Theresa Weinbeck Lynch.  His great grandparents, Michael and Bridget Flemming Lynch settled in Clinton County, Iowa, in 1840, the same year the County was established. He attended St. Mary's grade school and in 1928 he graduated from St. Mary's High School in Clinton.  He received his BA from the University of Iowa on June 5, 1933 and his JD on July 18, 1935.  He was initiated into McClain Inn of Phi Delta Phi on December 15, 1934 and was admitted to practice before the Iowa Supreme Court on June 15, 1935.  On November 14, 1936, he was appointed Assistant County Attorney for Clinton County, Iowa with an office in De Witt, Iowa, but was defeated when he ran for the office of County Attorney in November 1940 .

Move to Washington, D.C.

Following military service in World War II, he worked as an attorney for the United States Department of Agriculture in Washington, D.C. and subsequently was a hearing examiner for the Civil Aeronautics Board.  He retired as an Administrative Law Judge for the Federal Trade Commission.  Significant decisions made in that capacity include the L.G. Balfour decision in August 1967, the 1973 Corning Glass decision and the Wonder Bread decision announced on November 5, 1973.  It was in this case that he stated "Opinion based on opinion is like stepping on the springboard of imagination and springing into the realm of conjecture", an expression that he had remembered from his student days at the University of Iowa College of Law forty years earlier.

Family life

On April 12, 1937, he married Mary Catherine McCormick at Immaculate Conception Catholic church in Cedar Rapids, Iowa.  She died on December 10, 2000.

References

"The New York Times" March 25, 1967 p. F31
"The Wall Street Journal" August 15, 1967 p. 11
"Los Angeles Times" November 14, 1971 p. I5
"The Chicago Tribune" December 27, 1972 p. B8
"The Washington Post and Times-Herald" December 28, 1972 p. B9
"Washington Evening Star and Daily News" January 11, 1973 p. A-11
"Los Angeles Times" January 14, 1973 p. H6
"The Washington Post and Times-Herald" January 19, 1973 p. D8
"The Washington Post and Times-Herald" June 19, 1973 p. D16
"The Washington Post and Times-Herald" November 6, 1973 p. B1
"The Washington Post" June 15, 2007

1909 births
2007 deaths
People from Clinton, Iowa
University of Iowa alumni
Federal Trade Commission personnel
University of Iowa College of Law alumni
Iowa lawyers
20th-century American judges
20th-century American lawyers